The Swiss Agency for Therapeutic Products (Swissmedic) is the Swiss surveillance authority for medicines and medical devices, registered in Bern. It began operations on 1 January 2002 as successor of Interkantonale Kontrollstelle für Heilmittel (IKS), which was itself the successor of Schweizerische Arzneimittelnebenwirkungszentrale (SANZ). Swissmedic is affiliated to the Federal Department of Home Affairs.

Structure
Swissmedic is a federal institution subject to public law and was created by the Federal Act on Medicinal Products and Medical Devices. It is independent in organization and management and has authority over its own budget. Swissmedic has 300 full-time employees.

Functions
Any medical products for humans or animals need approval from Swissmedic to be brought on the Swiss market. Moreover, Swissmedic must be notified of all clinical studies conducted in Switzerland.

When authorising new medicinal products, Swissmedic bases its decisions on internationally acknowledged criteria. The products may only be placed on the market if their quality, safety and effectiveness are sufficiently evaluated and proved. If the criteria for authorisation are fulfilled, Swissmedic grants the marketing authorisation, specifies the method of sale (on prescription only/dispensing point) and approves the information for healthcare professionals and the patient information.

Costs of approval are paid by the applicant. Approval must be renewed after five years.

Notes and references

External links
 Official website
 Swissmedic Guidances

Pharmaceuticals policy
Medical and health organisations based in Switzerland
Federal Department of Home Affairs
National agencies for drug regulation